David P. Ballou is a professor emeritus of biological chemistry at the University of Michigan Medical School in the United States. He is best known for his development of rapid-reaction techniques, including stopped flow and rapid freeze-quench EPR methods, as tools to study the mechanisms of enzymes containing flavin, iron, cobalamin, or pyridoxal phosphate cofactors. Many of these studies were performed in collaboration with other scientists, most often with colleagues at Michigan.

Biography 

David Ballou grew up in Connecticut. He received a B.S. in chemistry from Antioch College in 1965. In 1971, he received a Ph.D. from the University of Michigan under the supervision of Graham Palmer. From 1971-1972, he was a postdoctoral fellow with Vincent Massey and Minor J. Coon at the University of Michigan. He has been a faculty member in the Department of Biological Chemistry at the University of Michigan Medical School since 1972.
In 2007, Ballou became a Fellow of the American Association for the Advancement of Science in recognition of his discovery of enzyme intermediates that are involved in biological oxidation reactions. His most cited paper, l, "Oxidative Protein Folding Is Driven by the Electron Transport System", has been cited  311 times according to Google Scholar, and he has contributed to  25 papers having more than 0100 citations each.

Books 

Fundamental Laboratory Approaches for Biochemistry and Biotechnology (2nd Ed) (2009) by Alexander J. Ninfa, David P. Ballou, and Marilee Benore. Published by Wiley.

References

External links 
 Ballou et al publications on Pubmed
 David Ballou's page at the University of Michigan Medical School archived from the original. 

Living people
American biochemists
Fellows of the American Association for the Advancement of Science
University of Michigan College of Literature, Science, and the Arts alumni
University of Michigan faculty
Year of birth missing (living people)